Deraz Ab may refer to:
 Deraz Ab, Razavi Khorasan
 Deraz Ab, Semnan
 Deraz Ab-e Olya, Razavi Khorasan Province
 Deraz Ab-e Sofla, Razavi Khorasan Province